BP Tauri is a young T Tauri star in the constellation of Taurus about  away, belonging to the Taurus Molecular Cloud.

Properties
Its chromospheric magnetic fields are rather strong at 2.5 kilogauss, and contains strong non-dipole components. The star is producing 40% of its luminosity via the energy released by accretion.

Suspected companions 
These were proven to be a background stars not related to BP Tauri with Gaia data though.

Protoplanetary system
The star is surrounded by a protoplanetary disk. The disk is strongly depleted in carbon and carbon monoxide.

Variability 
BP Tauri varies in brightness, producing a strong flares due to unsteady accretion held by stellar magnetic field. The lightcurve period is variable from 6.1 to 7.6 days, and quiescent periods without variability are also known.

References 

T Tauri stars
Circumstellar disks
Taurus (constellation)
281934
020160
J04191583+2906269
Tauri, BP
K-type stars